Jason Giobbi (born 16 September 1968) is an Australian former bobsledder. He competed in the two man and the four man events at the 1998 Winter Olympics.

References

External links
 

1968 births
Living people
Australian male bobsledders
Olympic bobsledders of Australia
Bobsledders at the 1998 Winter Olympics
People from Broken Hill, New South Wales
Sportsmen from New South Wales